Coco (Original Motion Picture Soundtrack) is the soundtrack album to the Disney/Pixar's 2017 film of the same name. Released by Walt Disney Records on November 19, 2017, the album features eight original songs written by Germaine Franco, Adrian Molina, Robert Lopez and Kristen Anderson-Lopez, four alternate versions and 26 score pieces composed by Michael Giacchino.

The score was released in 17 languages: English, Spanish, Portuguese, French, Italian, German,  Dutch, Flemish, Polish, Swedish,  Finnish,  Norwegian, Russian, Kazakh, Japanese,  Mandarin Chinese, and Korean. Exclusive versions of "Remember Me" in by another singer was included in certain releases: Spanish (Carlos Rivera), French (Sébastien Chato, in Spanish), Italian (Michele Bravi, in Italian and Spanish), Japanese (voice of Miguel), Chinese (Mao Bu Yi) and Korean (Yoon Jong-shin). The Swedish, Finnish and Norwegian versions share an electronic remix of Miguel and Natalia Lafourcade's cover, and the Japanese version also has a ska remix by Kavka Shishido and the Tokyo Ska Paradise Orchestra in both Japanese and Spanish, and is the only version with karaoke versions of the song.

Background
On July 14, 2017, at the Disney D23 expo, Michael Giacchino had confirmed that he will be scoring the music for Coco. Later, Robert Lopez, and Kristen Anderson-Lopez also confirmed that they will be writing few original songs, while Germaine Franco and co-director Adrian Molina, also joined the team. Recording for the score began on August 14, 2017.

Originally, the film was meant to be a "break-into-song" musical. Lopez and Anderson-Lopez had written many more songs for the film than what ended up in the released version; one piece that survived in storyboard until late into the production was an expository song that explained the Mexican holiday to viewers to begin the film. In another song, Miguel's mother explains the tradition of shoe-making in their family, and how this means he is not allowed to pursue music. Plans for the film to be a full musical film were scrapped following early test screenings.

Following the 90th Academy Awards ceremony, where "Remember Me" won the award for Best Original Song, the album broke the top 40 on the Billboard 200 charts, jumping from 120 to 39, where it peaked before dropping to 64. In the week of March 8, the Miguel version of "Remember Me" gained 1.58million plays via online streaming, according to the Nielsen Music.

Track listing

Certifications

Notes

References

2017 soundtrack albums
2010s film soundtrack albums
Walt Disney Records soundtracks
Pixar soundtracks
Fantasy film soundtracks
Latin pop soundtracks